Still is a surname. Notable people with the name include:

 Alexa Still (born 1963), New Zealand-born flutist
 Alicia Lloyd Still (1869–1944), British nurse, teacher and hospital matron
 Andrew Taylor Still (1828–1917), American physician and founder of osteopathy
 Art Still (born 1955), American professional football player; brother of Valerie (below)
 Bryan Still (born 1974), American professional football player
 Clyfford Still (1904–1980), American artist and painter
 Eric Still (born 1967), American football player
 George Frederic Still (1868–1941), English pediatrician and author
 James Still (1906–2001), American poet, novelist and folklorist
 John Still (c. 1540–1608), English clergyman
 Judith Still (fl. 2018), English academic
 Ken Still (1935–2017), American professional golfer
 Melly Still (born 1962), British director, designer and choreographer
 Nanny Still (1926–2009), Finnish designer
 Robert Still (cricketer) (1822–1907), early Australian cricketer
 Robert Still (1910–1971), English composer, educator and amateur tennis player
 S. S. Still (1852–1931), American osteopathic physician
 Shawn Still, listed as secretary for Georgia on false slate of Trump electors	
 Susan Still (women's rights activist) (born 1964), American women's rights activist
 Susan Still Kilrain (born 1961), American astronaut
 Valerie Still (born 1961), American professional basketball player; sister of Art (above)
 William Grant Still (1895–1978), African-American classical composer
 William Joseph Still (1870–?), English engineer
 William Still (1821–1902/21–1902), African-American abolitionist

Fictional
 Clark Still, from the 1986 arcade game Ikari Warriors